Mexican pointy boots (Spanish: Botas picudas mexicanas) or tribal boots (Spanish: botas tribaleras) are a style of pointed fashion boots made with elongated toes that were a popular footwear for men in parts of Mexico. The boots were commonly worn in an ironic and comedic way by males involved in the trival music subculture that thrived in the early 2010s.

Origin and expansion 
The boots reportedly originated around 2009 in Monterrey in the Mexican state of Nuevo León, located in Northeastern Mexico. Following their creation, the trend had expanded to parts of the United States where large numbers of Monterreyen migrants live, particularly in Dallas, Texas, but also in Tennessee, Mississippi and Oklahoma.

Design 
The boots are then further modified according to the wearer's personal taste. Alterations incorporate paint and sequins and can go as far as adding flashing LEDs, disco balls, and mirrors.

Dancing 
The appearance of the pointy boots has coincided with the popularity of "tribal guarachero" electronic music, hyphy tribal or tribal. Tribal music has been described as "a mixture of Pre-Columbian sounds mixed with fast cumbia bass and electro house beats." Boys and men that wear the pointy boots have formed all-male troupes (Group dance teams) to compete in danceoffs at local nightclubs to tribal music. Participants in the contests spend weeks choreographing their dance moves and fabricating their outfits which commonly include "matching western shirts and skinny jeans to accentuate their footwear." In Monterrey, prize money ranges from $100 to $500. The prize often includes a bottle of whiskey.

The dance troupes have reportedly become so popular that they are being hired to entertain "at weddings, for quinceañeras, celebrations of the Virgin of Guadalupe and bachelorette parties" and there is even one report of a crew entertaining after a funeral.

See also 
 Pointed shoe (disambiguation)
 Trival dance music (tribal-guarachero)
 Crakow

References

External links 
 , Vice, April 1, 2011
 , Associated Press, May 16, 2011

2010s fashion
Boots
Mexican clothing
San Luis Potosí
2000s fashion
American clothing
Footwear